Pio XII may be:

 Pio XII, Maranhão
 Pope Pius XII